This is a list of nonfiction books about homosexuality ordered by author last name. Books are included on this list based on notability quantified by numbers of citations in other publications (as confirmed by Google Scholar). Books not specifically about homosexuality, with no ISBN or no citations will be removed.

 is romantic or sexual attraction or behavior among members of the same sex, situationally or in an enduring disposition.

Books by author

A-D
 
 
 Adam, Barry (1987). The Rise of a Gay and Lesbian Movement, G. K. Hall & Co. 

 Bérubé, Allan, Coming out under Fire: The History of Gay Men and Women in World War Two, New York: MacMillan 1990, 

 Brown, Lester G., Two Spirit People, 1997, Harrington Park Press, 
 Bullough et al. (eds.) (1996). Handbook of Medieval Sexuality. Garland Publishing, 

 Dover, Kenneth J., Greek Homosexuality, Gerald Duckworth & Co. Ltd. 1979,  (hardcover),  (paperback)

E-G
 d'Emilio, John Sexual Politics, Sexual Communities: The Making of a Homosexual Minority in the United States, 1940-1970, University of Chicago Press 1983, 
 Faderman, Lillian, Odd Girls and Twilight Lovers: A History of Lesbian Life in Twentieth Century America, Penguin 1992
 Gunther, Scott, The Elastic Closet: A History of Homosexuality in France, 1942-present Book about the history of homosexual movements in France (sample chapter available online). Palgrave-Macmillan, 2009. .

H-P
 Hinsch, Bret, Passions of the Cut Sleeve: The Male Homosexual Tradition in China, The University of California Press, 1990, 

Kowalski J.A. (2015). The origins of homosexuality emancipation. Opole, Poland: The Institute of Sex Research Press. an Amazon Kindle edition, .
LeVay S (1996). Queer Science: The Use and Abuse of Research into Homosexuality.  Cambridge: MIT Press. 
LeVay S, (2011). Gay, Straight, and the Reason Why: The Science of Sexual Orientation. New York: Oxford University Press. 
 Michael, Robert T., John H. Gagnon, Edward O. Laumann, and Gina Kolata. Sex in America: A definitive survey. Boston: Little, Brown, 1995.

Q-S

 Sullivan, Andrew. VIRTUALLY NORMAL An Argument About Homosexuality 209 pages. Alfred A. Knopf.1995
 Queeristan (2020) by Parmesh Shahani

T-Z
 Tamagne, Florence. A History of Homosexuality in Europe Vol. I & II, Berlin, London, Paris 1919-1939. New York: Algora Publishing, 2004.

See also
Homosexuality
List of LGBT periodicals
LGBT literature
List of lesbian fiction

Bibliographies of subcultures

Nonfiction books